The Stranger (German: Die Fremde) is a 1931 French-German drama film directed by Fred Sauer and starring Gerda Maurus, Peter Voß and Harry Hardt.

The film's sets were designed by the art director Lazare Meerson. It was shot at the Epinay Studios in Paris. It was made as a Multiple-language version with separate versions also produced in French and Italian.

Synopsis
The wife of an American millionaire begins a passionate relationship with his secretary.

Cast
 Gerda Maurus
 Peter Voß
 Harry Hardt
 Alfred Beierle
 Grete Natzler
 Heinz Salfner

References

Bibliography
 Alfred Krautz. International directory of cinematographers, set- and costume designers in film, Volume 4. Saur, 1984.

External links

1931 films
1931 drama films
German drama films
French drama films
Films of the Weimar Republic
1930s German-language films
Films directed by Fred Sauer
German multilingual films
Films shot at Epinay Studios
German black-and-white films
French black-and-white films
French multilingual films
1931 multilingual films
1930s German films
1930s French films